Lucio Malan (born 30 July 1960) is an Italian politician.

Malan was born in Luserna San Giovanni, Turin. In 1983 he graduated in Literature at the University of Turin.

Lucio Malan is member of the People of Freedom Party. From 1994 to 1996 he was a deputy. Since 2001 he has been senator and secretary of the presidency of Italian Senate. He is also a member of NATO Parliamentary Assembly.

Lucio Malan is a member of the Waldensian Evangelical Church.

From 1990 to 1998 he was guest speaker of Italian History and Culture at University Studies Abroad Consortium in Turin, Italy.

From 1998 to 2008 he has been the director of communications of Forza Italia.

Malan chairs the Italy-Taiwan parliamentary friendship group.

References

External links
 Lucio Malan at the Italian Senate website
 Newspaper Venerdi Di Repubblica, June 5, 2009, p. 31, article Ora c'è chi ha preso il Senato per un'agenzia immobiliare

1960 births
Living people
People from Luserna San Giovanni
Italian Waldensians
Lega Nord politicians
Forza Italia politicians
The People of Freedom politicians
Forza Italia (2013) politicians
Brothers of Italy politicians
Deputies of Legislature XII of Italy
Senators of Legislature XIV of Italy
Senators of Legislature XV of Italy
Senators of Legislature XVI of Italy
Senators of Legislature XVII of Italy
Senators of Legislature XVIII of Italy
Politicians of Piedmont
University of Turin alumni
University of Nevada, Las Vegas alumni
Forza Italia (2013) senators